Woodland is a two-story Victorian Eclectic-style house on   of property in rural Wheeler County, Georgia.  It was built in c.1877 and is listed on the National Register of Historic Places.  Its NRHP nomination noted that it has "outstanding Gothic-style scroll-sawn detailing".

It has an L-shaped main section and a rectangular rear addition.  The house was built by Walter T. McArthur (1837-1894), who inherited the property in 1877 and developed it as an element of the family's lumber plantation.  The property was sold in 1917 to Emory Winship (1872-1932) who used it as a hunting estate.

References

Houses on the National Register of Historic Places in Georgia (U.S. state)
Victorian architecture in Georgia (U.S. state)
Houses completed in 1870
National Register of Historic Places in Wheeler County, Georgia